Conformal fuel tanks (CFTs) are additional fuel tanks fitted closely to the profile of an aircraft that extend the endurance of the aircraft.

Advantages
CFTs have a reduced aerodynamic penalty compared to external drop tanks, and do not significantly increase an aircraft's radar cross-section. Another advantage CFTs provide is that they do not occupy ordnance hardpoints like drop tanks, allowing the aircraft to carry its full payload.

Disadvantages
Conformal fuel tanks have the disadvantage that, unlike drop tanks, they cannot be discarded in flight, because they are plumbed into the aircraft and so can only be removed on the ground. As a result, they will impose a slight drag-penalty and minor weight gain on the aircraft even when the tanks are empty, without any benefit. They can also impose slight g-load limits, although not always an absolute issue: the CFTs on the F-15E actually allow the same maneuverability without g-limitations.

Examples

Conformal fuel tanks
F-15C Eagle/F-15E Strike Eagle
F-15C entered service with CFT capability. Initially known as FAST packs (Fuel And Sensor Tactical), each unit carried an additional  of fuel, while retaining hardpoints for four AIM-7F Sparrow missiles or bombs, some on the FAST packs. They were first tested on the F-15B in 1974. All U.S. F-15Es, and Strike Eagle export variants such as the Israeli and Singapore models, are fitted with CFTs under the wing outside the engine intake and require modification to fly without them. The FAST pack was originally intended to carry a navigational and targeting infrared sensor system (thus "Fuel And Sensor"); however, the F-15 simply began carrying LANTIRN pods for ground-attack missions instead.

F-16C/D Block 50/52+, F-16E/F Block 60 and F-16I Sufa
Export aircraft for Greece, Chile, Israel, Poland, Pakistan, Turkey, Singapore, Morocco, Egypt and the UAE are plumbed for carriage of two CFTs mounted atop the aircraft near the wing root. Together they hold , 3050lb of fuel.
Dassault Rafale
Two  CFTs were first tested by Dassault in April 2001.
Mikoyan MiG-29SMT – MiG-29S (Product 9.13)- Mikoyan MiG-35
One  CFTs in a further enlarged spine.
Eurofighter Typhoon
Wind tunnel tested by BAE, two CFTs with  capacity each.
AIDC F-CK-1 Ching-kuo
The F-CK-1D prototype ("Brave Hawk") and the F-CK-1C single-seater prototype are equipped with the new CFTs. The prototype Indigenous Defence Fighter II “Goshawk” has over-wing CFTs.
Advanced Super Hornet
Conformal fuel tanks are mounted above the wings to replace the drag of underwing tanks. Combined, they carry 1,590 kg (3,500 lb) of extra fuel, while adding extra lift and expanding combat radius by 130 nmi (240 km) with a small transonic acceleration penalty.
Chengdu J-10
Wind Tunnel tested by Chengdu.
BAC Strikemaster
Conformal fuel tanks were installed on the wingtips.

WWII:
Supermarine Spitfire in the belly.
Messerschmitt Bf 109 in the belly.
Messerschmitt Bf 110D-1 in the belly – nicknamed Dackelbauch (dachshund's belly).

Distended internal tanks
Distended internal tanks are fuel tanks that either create a bulge in the fuselage, or are mounted flush with the fuselage.
 English Electric Lightning Conformal ventral store was used for a small or large belly fuel tank which bulges out from the underbody.
Gloster Javelin fitted with dual flush-mounted belly tanks with a capacity of 1,137 liters (300 US gallons). They were known as "bosom tanks" or "Sabrinas".
 Gloster Meteor.
 Shenyang J-6.
 Nanchang Q-5 "Fantan" weapons bay fuel tank extends below the fuselage profile.

References
Notes

 Green, William and Gordon Swanborough. The Complete Book of Fighters. New York: Barnes & Noble Inc., 1988. .
 Lambert, Mark, ed. Jane's All the World's Aircraft 1993–94. Alexandria, Virginia: Jane's Information Group Inc., 1993. .

Aircraft fuel system components
Fuel containers